John Andress (born 20 January 1984) is an Irish former rugby union player. He played as a prop. During his career, Andress played for English sides Exeter Chiefs, Harlequins and Worcester Warriors and Scottish side Edinburgh. He returned to Ireland in 2016 to play for Munster, retiring due to a lack of game time in December of that year, but shortly after he came out of retirement to play for an injury-stricken Connacht. After this stint with the western province, Andress retired from professional rugby again.

Early life
He attended Campbell College, Belfast.

Career
Andress, who has played for Ireland at both A and Under-21 level, originally joined Exeter Chiefs in 2007 and made 44 appearances before moving to Harlequins in 2009. He returned to Exeter in 2011 and impressed as the Chiefs enjoyed another strong campaign, finishing fifth in the Aviva Premiership. Andress then joined another Aviva Premiership team, Worcester Warriors, in 2012, before moving to Scottish Pro12 side Edinburgh Rugby in 2014.

In March 2016, it was announced that Andress would be joining Edinburgh's Pro12 rivals, Irish province Munster, for the 2016–17 season. He announced his retirement from rugby union in December 2016, having not played for Munster in his time there. Later that month however Andress joined another Irish province, Connacht, as temporary injury covery.

References

External links
Munster Profile
Worcester Profile
Edinburgh Profile
Ireland A Profile

1984 births
Living people
Irish rugby union players
Harlequin F.C. players
Worcester Warriors players
Exeter Chiefs players
Edinburgh Rugby players
Munster Rugby players
Connacht Rugby players
Rugby union props